The 2021–22 T1 League season was the first season of the T1 League, with the Kaohsiung Aquas, the New Taipei CTBC DEA, the Taichung Wagor Suns, the Tainan TSG GhostHawks, the TaiwanBeer HeroBears and the Taoyuan Leopards participating in this competition. The regular season started on November 27, 2021 and ended on May 20, 2022. The play-in series was played on May 22. The semifinals series started on May 24 and ended on May 28. The finals series started on started on May 31 and ended on June 4. On June 4, the Kaohsiung Aquas defeated the Taichung Wagor Suns, 3–0, winning the 2021–22 season championship.

Teams

Season Format
 Each team plays against another six times, three at home and three on the road, respectively. Each team plays 30 matches total in the regular season.
 Play-in Series: Best-of-three series. The series are contested by the teams that finished the regular season as the fourth seed and fifth seed. The fourth seed is awarded a one-win advantage. The winner can qualify to the semifinals series.
 Semifinals Series: Best-of-five series. Matchup is decided by seeding in regular season. The first seed plays against the winner of play-in series. The second seed plays against the third seed. The winners can qualify for the finals series. Due to the COVID-19 pandemic in Taiwan, the semifinals series change to best-of-three series.
 Finals Series: Best-of-seven series. The series are contested by the winners of semifinals series. Due to the COVID-19 pandemic in Taiwan, the finals series change to best-of-five series.

Import Players Restrictions
 Each team is able to register up to four general import players and two type-III players.
 Each team is able to select three general import players and one type-III player into active roster in each match.
 The maximum of import players on the court is two.
 10-Imports-In-4-Quarters Rule : two quarters can have 2 import players and 1 type-III player on the court, and other two quarters can have 2 import players or 1 import player and 1 type-III player on the court.
 Type-III player eligibility:
 (1) Naturalized players
 (2) Asian import players
 (3) Foreign students
 (4) Overseas compatriots

Import / Type-III players

Rosters and Transactions

Coaching changes

Off-season
 On July 30, 2021, the New Taipei CTBC DEA hired Lee Yi-Hua as their new head coach.
 On August 7, 2021, the Kaohsiung Aquas hired Brendan Joyce as their new head coach.
 On August 20, 2021, the Taoyuan Leopards hired Wang Chih-Chun as their new head coach.
 On September 16, 2021, the TaiwanBeer HeroBears hired Yang Chih-Hao as their new head coach.
 On September 29, 2021, the Taichung Wagor Suns hired Iurgi Caminos as their new head coach.
 On October 3, 2021, the Tainan TSG GhostHawks hired Wu Chih-Wei as their new head coach.

In-season
 On April 1, 2022, the Tainan TSG GhostHawks named Wu Chih-Wei as their team director, and Liu Meng-Chu as their interim head coach.
 On April 10, 2022, the Taoyuan Leopards announced that Wang Chih-Chun resigned from head coach, and named Su Yi-Chieh as their interim head coach.
 On May 16, 2022, the Taoyuan Leopards announced Liu Chia-Fa as their new head coach.

Preseason
The preseason began on November 13, 2021, and ended on November 14. The T1 League held the Kaohsiung Port Pre-season matches at the Kaohsiung Arena.

Kaohsiung Port Pre-season matches

Regular season

The regular season started on November 27, 2021 and ended on May 20, 2022. On November 27, the 2021–22 season opening game, matched by Kaohsiung Aquas and TaiwanBeer HeroBears, was played at University of Taipei Tianmu Campus Gymnasium.

League table

Postponed games due to COVID-19
 Two TaiwanBeer HeroBears home games (against the Tainan TSG GhostHawks on January 22, and against the Kaohsiung Aquas on January 23) were postponed to May 7 and 8 due to the COVID-19 pandemic preventive measures of Taipei City Government.
 Three Taoyuan Leopards home games (against the TaiwanBeer HeroBears on January 29, against the Kaohsiung Aquas on February 5, and against the Taichung Wagor Suns on February 6) were postponed to April 30, May 1 and April 29 due to the COVID-19 pandemic in Taiwan.
 Two Taoyuan Leopards home games (against the Tainan TSG GhostHawks on February 19, and against the Kaohsiung Aquas on February 20) were postponed to March 25 and 11 due to the COVID-19 pandemic in Taiwan.
 Two Taoyuan Leopards home games (against the New Taipei CTBC DEA on April 2, and against the Taichung Wagor Suns on April 3) were postponed to May 7 and 8 due to the COVID-19 pandemic in Taiwan.
 One Taoyuan Leopards home game (against the TaiwanBeer HeroBears on April 30) was postponed to May 6 due to the player of the TaiwanBeer HeroBears tested positive.
 Three Taoyuan Leopards home games (against the TaiwanBeer HeroBears on May 6, against the New Taipei CTBC DEA on May 7, and against the Taichung Wagor Suns on May 8) were postponed to May 19, 18 and 20 due to the Taoyuan Leopards cannot reach the minimum player number.
 Two TaiwanBeer HeroBears home games (against the Tainan TSG GhostHawks on May 7, and against the Kaohsiung Aquas on May 8) were postponed to May 18 and 20 due to the TaiwanBeer HeroBears cannot reach the minimum player number.

Playoffs

 Play-in Series: The fourth and fifth seeds play the best-of-three play-in series. The fourth seed will be awarded a one-win advantage. The winner can qualify the semifinals series.
 Semifinals Series: The winner of play-in series and the top three seeds play the best-of-five semifinals series. The winners can qualify the finals series. Due to the COVID-19 pandemic in Taiwan, the semifinals series change to best-of-three series.
 Finals Series: The winners of the semifinals series play the best-of-seven finals series. Due to the COVID-19 pandemic in Taiwan, the finals series change to best-of-five series.

Bracket

Bold Series winner
Italic Team with home-court advantage

Statistics

Individual statistic leaders

Individual game highs

Team statistic leaders

Awards

Yearly awards

All-T1 League First Team: 
 Hu Long-Mao (Kaohsiung Aquas)
 Jason Brickman (Kaohsiung Aquas)
 Chiang Yu-An (TaiwanBeer HeroBears)
 Sani Sakakini (Taichung Wagor Suns)
 Mohammad Al Bachir Gadiaga (New Taipei CTBC DEA)

All-Defensive First Team: 
 Chiang Yu-An (TaiwanBeer HeroBears)
 Hu Long-Mao (Kaohsiung Aquas)
 Lin Ping-Sheng (New Taipei CTBC DEA)
 Mindaugas Kupšas (Kaohsiung Aquas)
 Deyonta Davis (Taoyuan Leopards)

Statistical awards

Finals

MVP of the Month
MVP of the Month awards were only for local players.

Import of the Month
Import of the Month awards were only for import players and type-III players.

Arenas
 The Kaohsiung Aquas announced that they would play their home games at the Kaohsiung Arena on May 26, 2021.
 The Taichung Wagor Suns announced that they would play their home games at the National Taiwan University of Sport Gymnasium on June 19, 2021.
 The New Taipei CTBC DEA announced that they would play their home games at the Xinzhuang Gymnasium, and would share the same arena with the New Taipei Kings of the P. League+ on September 4, 2021.
 The TaiwanBeer HeroBears announced that they would play their home games at the University of Taipei Tianmu Campus Gymnasium on September 16, 2021. And they scheduled two of their home games at the Taipei Heping Basketball Gymnasium.
 The Taoyuan Leopards announced that they would play their home games at the Chung Yuan Christian University Gymnasium.
 The Tainan TSG GhostHawks announced that they would play their home games at the Chia Nan University of Pharmacy and Science Shao Tsung Gymnasium on November 15, 2021.
 The Kaohsiung Aquas announced that they would play their home games in playoffs at the Fengshan Gymnasium on April 17, 2022.
 The Taoyuan Leopards announced that their home games on April 23 and 24, 2022 would change to Taipei Heping Basketball Gymnasium in Taipei City.
 The Taoyuan Leopards announced that their home games on May 18 to 20, 2022 would change to Taoyuan Arena.

Media
 The games will be broadcast on television via Eleven Sports and ELTA TV, and online via 17LIVE.
 The games will be broadcast online via Twitch since 2022 and via Facebook since January 26.
 The games will be broadcast online via LINE TODAY since play-in series.

See also 
 2021–22 Kaohsiung Aquas season
 2021–22 New Taipei CTBC DEA season
 2021–22 Taichung Wagor Suns season
 2021–22 Tainan TSG GhostHawks season
 2021–22 TaiwanBeer HeroBears season
 2021–22 Taoyuan Leopards season

Note

References

External links 
 

2021–22 T1 League season
T
Basketball events postponed due to the COVID-19 pandemic